The Primetime Emmy Award for Outstanding New Series was a Primetime Emmy Award presented to the best new television series sporadically from 1954 to 1973.

Winners and nominations

1950s

1970s

New Series, Outstanding
Awards disestablished in 1973
Awards established in 1954